Gary McFarlane may refer to:
a minor character in the 2008 season of British television soap Emmerdale
the applicant in McFarlane v Relate Avon Ltd, a 2010 case in the Court of Appeal of England and Wales